Steven Charles Benjamin Tomlinson (born 21 December 1978) is a Barbadian born former Welsh cricketer.  Tomlinson was a right-handed batsman who bowled right-arm medium-fast.  He was born in Bridgetown, Barbados.

Tomlinson was educated at The Oratory School, where he was awarded the Wetherall Award for the leading All-Rounder in English Schools in both 1996 and 1997. Having played age group and Second XI cricket for Glamorgan, Tomlinson made his debut for county at senior level in a List A match against Surrey in the Sunday League. He played one further match for Glamorgan, which came in the same competition against Warwickshire.

In 1999, he joined Devon, making his debut for the county in the Minor Counties Championship against Cheshire. Between 1999 and 2000 he played in 11 Championship matches for Devon, the last of which came against Cornwall. He played just a single match for Devon in 2001, in a List A fixture against Shropshire in the first round of the 2001 Cheltenham & Gloucester Trophy.

References

External links

1978 births
Living people
Cricketers from Bridgetown
People educated at The Oratory School
Alumni of Cardiff Metropolitan University
Welsh cricketers
Glamorgan cricketers
Devon cricketers